The '''Burkinabe ambassador is the official representative of the Government in Ouagadougou to a government or a subject of International law.

List of representatives

See also
List of ambassadors to Burkina Faso

References